Iranshahr (also Romanized as Īrānshahr; formerly, Pahrah, Fahrej, and Qal'eh-ye Nāşerī) is an Iranian city which serves as the capital of Iranshahr County, Sistan and Baluchestan Province. As of 2010 the population of Iranshahr was 100,000. The city is predominantly inhabited by ethnic Baloch speaking the Balochi language.

Prior to 1935, the city was referred to as Pahrah, also spelt Poora, Poorah, and Pura, meaning "defence" in Persian. The name was changed to Iranshahr by Mohammad Reza Shah Pahlavi in around 1941.

Pahrah is the site where Alexander the Great celebrated with and regrouped his troops after his Indian conquests.  Bampur, where the ancient Bampur fort is located, is nearby the city.

Climate

Iranshahr has a hot desert climate (Köppen climate classification BWh) with extremely hot summers and mild winters. Precipitation is very low, and mostly falls in winter.

References

Populated places in Iranshahr County
Cities in Sistan and Baluchestan Province